Svend Holm (25 October 1895 – 24 August 1985) was a Danish footballer. He played in one match for the Denmark national football team in 1919.

References

External links
 

1895 births
1985 deaths
Danish men's footballers
Denmark international footballers
Place of birth missing
Association footballers not categorized by position